The Zittau Mountains, formerly also called the Lusatian Ridge (Lausitzer Kamm), refer to the German part of the Lusatian Mountains that straddle the Saxon-Bohemian border in the extreme southeast of the German state of Saxony.

Geography

Location 
The Zittau Mountains lie in the extreme south of the district of Görlitz in Saxony. A few kilometres north of the range lie a number of settlements; from west to east they are Großschönau, Hainewalde, Olbersdorf, Bertsdorf-Hörnitz and Zittau. In the mountains themselves are, again from west to east, the settlements of Waltersdorf, Oybin, Jonsdorf and Lückendorf . The highlands are drained by streams that flow roughly north into the Mandau, a western tributary of the Lusatian Neisse.

Mountains 
Among the highest mountains in the range are the following (in order of height in m above NN:
 Lausche (Luž; 792.6 m), German-Czech border mountain, south of Waltersdorf
 Hochwald (Hvozd; 749.5 m), German-Czech border mountain, south-southwest of Oybin
 Jonsberg (652.9 m), east-southeast of Jonsdorf
 Buchberg (651.6 m), west of Jonsdorf
 Scharfenstein (569.4 m), east of Oybin, north-northwest of Lückendorf
 Breiteberg (510.1 m), east of Großschönau, south of Hainewalde
 Oybin (514.5 m), north of Oybin
 Töpfer (582.0 m), northeast of Oybin, south of Olbersdorf

Places of interest 
 Oybin mountain with castle and monastery ruins
 Mühlsteinbrüche, rock formations in Jonsdorf
 Große Felsengasse ("Great Rock Alley")
 Töpfer mountain
 Lausche (792.6m), the highest summit in the Zittau Mountains
 Breiteberg
 Scharfenstein
 Orgel (organ) - a rock formation in the Jonsdorfer Felsenstadt
 Kelchstein ("Chalice Rock") a mushroom rock formation
 Nonnenfelsen ("Nun's Rock") near Jonsdorf
 Zittau Narrow Gauge Railway
 Lusatian timber-frame farmhouses (Umgebindehäuser), especially in Waltersdorf, Jonsdorf and Bertsdorf

See also 
 Zittau Mountains Nature Park
 List of regions of Saxony

References

General sources 
 BfN
 Map services
 Landscape fact file Zittau Mountains

Literature 
 Peter Rölke (ed.): Wander- & Naturführer Zittauer Gebirge, Berg- & Naturverlag Rölke, Dresden 2006,

External links 
Zittau Mountains
private website about the mountains
Mountain biking in the Zittau Mountains
Digital climbing guide to the Zittau Mountains
Lusatian Mountains

 
Central Uplands
Forests and woodlands of Saxony
Görlitz (district)
Zittau
Natural regions of Saxony
Mountain ranges of Saxony
Lusatian Mountains
Upper Lusatia